The 1985 Montreal Expos season was the 17th season in franchise history. They finished with a record of 84-77, 3rd in the NL East and 16 1/2 games behind the St. Louis Cardinals.

Offseason
 November 7, 1984: Chris Welsh was traded by the Expos to the Texas Rangers for Dave Hostetler.
 November 14, 1984: Larry Walker was signed by the Expos as an amateur free agent.
 December 4, 1984: Jack Daugherty was purchased by the Expos from the Helena Gold Sox.
 December 7, 1984: Bob James was traded by the Expos to the Chicago White Sox for Vance Law.
 December 7, 1984: Bryan Little was traded by the Expos to the Chicago White Sox for Bert Roberge.
 December 10, 1984 Gary Carter was traded by the Expos to the New York Mets for Hubie Brooks, Mike Fitzgerald, Herm Winningham and Floyd Youmans.
 January 9, 1985: Mike Stenhouse was traded by the Expos to the Minnesota Twins for Jack O'Connor.
 March 28, 1985: Bobby Ramos was released by the Expos.

Spring training
The Expos held spring training at West Palm Beach Municipal Stadium in West Palm Beach, Florida – a facility they shared with the Atlanta Braves. It was their ninth season at the stadium; they had conducted spring training there from 1969 to 1972 and since 1981.

Regular season
April 30, 1985: In an 11–0 loss to the Philadelphia Phillies, position player Razor Shines pitched one inning as the Expos pitching resources were depleted.

Opening Day starters

Season standings

Record vs. opponents

Notable transactions
 May 12, 1985: Dave Hostetler was purchased from the Expos by the Chicago Cubs.
 June 3, 1985: Randy Johnson was drafted by the Expos in the 2nd round of the 1985 Major League Baseball Draft. Johnson signed June 9, 1985.
 June 22, 1985: The Expos traded a player to be named later to the Toronto Blue Jays for Mitch Webster. The Expos completed the deal by sending Cliff Young to the Blue Jays on September 10.
 August 12, 1985: Doug Frobel was purchased by the Montreal Expos from the Pittsburgh Pirates.

Major League debuts
Batters:
Andrés Galarraga (Aug 23)
Al Newman (June 14)
Pitchers:
Tim Burke (Apr 8)
John Dopson (Sep 4)
Floyd Youmans (Jul 1)

Roster

Player stats

Batting

Starters by position
Note: Pos = Position; G = Games played; AB = At bats; H = Hits; Avg. = Batting average; HR = Home runs; RBI = Runs batted in

Other batters
Note; G = Games played; AB = At bats; H = Hits; Avg. = Batting average; HR = Home runs; RBI = Runs batted in

Pitching

Starting pitchers
Note: G = Games pitched; IP = Innings pitched; W = Wins; L = Losses; ERA = Earned run average; SO = Strikeouts

Other pitchers
Note: G = Games pitched; IP = Innings pitched; W = Wins; L = Losses; ERA = Earned run average; SO = Strikeouts

Relief pitchers
Note: G = Games pitched; W = Wins; L = Losses; SV = Saves; ERA = Earned run average; SO = Strikeouts

Award winners
Andre Dawson, National League Gold Glove
1985 Major League Baseball All-Star Game

Farm system

References

External links
 1985 Montreal Expos team page at Baseball Reference
 1985 Montreal Expos team page at www.baseball-almanac.com

Montreal Expos seasons
Montreal Expos season
1980s in Montreal
1985 in Quebec